Khiru Soeun (born 7 September 1943) is a Cambodian boxer. He competed in the men's featherweight event at the 1964 Summer Olympics. At the 1964 Summer Olympics, he defeated Hugo Martínez of Argentina in the Round of 32, before losing to Charles Brown of the United States in the Round of 16.

References

External links
 

1943 births
Living people
Cambodian male boxers
Olympic boxers of Cambodia
Boxers at the 1964 Summer Olympics
Place of birth missing (living people)
Asian Games medalists in boxing
Boxers at the 1962 Asian Games
Boxers at the 1970 Asian Games
Asian Games silver medalists for Cambodia
Medalists at the 1970 Asian Games
Featherweight boxers